Kvant is Russian for "quantum".  See quantum (disambiguation).

Kvant may also refer to:

 Kvant (magazine), a Russian popular science magazine
 Kvant, a journal published by the Danish Physical Society
 Kvant-1, a module of the Soviet orbital station Mir launched in 1987
 Kvant-2, a module of the Soviet orbital station Mir launched in 1989
 MAI Kvant, a Soviet aerobatic trainer airplane
 NPP Kvant, a Soviet research and production institute (now a subsidiary of the Russian space flight corporation Roscosmos)
 FC Kvant Obninsk, a Russian football club
 Lars Kvant, a Swedish squash player
 Kurt Kvant, a recurring character in detective novels by Maj Sjöwall and Per Wahlöö